Alexander Dmitriyevich Petrov (born 26 April 1999) is a Russian figure skater. He is the 2016 CS Nebelhorn Trophy champion and the 2016 Russian National bronze medalist. On the junior level, he is the 2014–15 Junior Grand Prix Final bronze medalist and the 2015 Russian Junior National champion. Petrov holds the title of Master of Sports of Russia.

Personal life 
Alexander Dmitriyevich Petrov was born 26 April 1999 in Saint Petersburg. He is the eldest child in his family and has one younger sister. Besides skating, Petrov also enjoys listening to music, playing soccer, snowboarding and skateboarding. He supports FC Zenit Saint Petersburg.

Career

Early career 
Petrov began skating at the age of 5 in 2004. His parents first took him skating because he had contracted bronchitis at a very young age. Under doctor's orders they were asked to either take him swimming or to the skating rink. Because he was only 5 years old, Petrov took up figure skating instead of ice hockey. Tatiana Mishina, Oleg Tataurov and Svetlana Frantsuzova were his earliest coaches.

In the 2009–10 season Petrov brought home the silver medal in the novice event at the 2010 Toruń Cup and finished just shy of a medal at Rostelecom Crystal Skate. The following season, Petrov won gold at the 2011 Toruń Cup, his first international gold medal. In the 2011-12 season, he won the novice event at the 2011 NRW Trophy in Dortmund, Germany and finished second in the junior event at Rostelecom Crystal Skate. Making his debut at the 2012 Russian Junior Championships, he finished 12th.

2012–13 season 
Petrov became age-eligible for the ISU Junior Grand Prix (JGP) series in the 2012-13 season and was assigned two JGP events in his debut season. He finished 5th in his JGP debut in Courchevel, France, and won the silver medal at his second JGP event in Turkey. A triple Axel was included in his programs for his first season on the ISU Junior Grand Prix circuit. This jump was landed and ratified in his second JGP event, albeit with a negative Grade of Execution (GOE). As the 2012-13 season progressed, Petrov went on to land several clean 3A with positive GOE, including one at the 4th stage of the Cup of Russia series in November 2012. Weeks later, at the 5th stage of the Cup of Russia series, Petrov landed a combined total of three clean 3A including a 3A-3T in the free skate. He won that competition with a score of 221.15. On the international scene, Petrov won gold medals in the junior events at the 2012 Coupe de Nice and the 2013 20th Volvo Open Cup. At the Russian Championships, he was tenth in his senior-level debut and won the bronze medal in the junior event. In his final competition of the season, Petrov won the junior gold medal at the 2013 Triglav Trophy with an overall score of 192.97 points, which included a 3A (1.00 GOE) in the short and 3A (2.00 GOE) and 3A-2T (1.00 GOE) in the free skate.

2013–14 season 
In the 2013-14 season, Alexei Mishin began coaching Petrov alongside Tatiana Mishina and Oleg Tataurov. Petrov won silver in his season's debut at the Junior Grand Prix event in Gdańsk, Poland and another silver medal in Ostrava, Czech Republic. He qualified for his first JGP Final. In November, Petrov competed in the first senior international of his career at the 2013 22nd Volvo Open Cup in Riga, Latvia and won the silver medal there. He beat several experienced skaters including compatriots Sergey Borodulin and Zhan Bush, finishing behind 4-time Olympic medalist Evgeni Plushenko. In Riga he landed a total of three clean 3As, including a 3A-2T in the long program. Petrov then finished 5th at the Junior Grand Prix Final held in Fukuoka, Japan. At the Russian Championships, Petrov ranked eighth on the senior level and improved on his previous showing by winning silver in the junior event, finishing 1.88 points behind Adian Pitkeev. He placed 4th at the 2014 World Junior Championships.

2014–15 season 

In his season's debut at the Junior Grand Prix series, Petrov took the silver medal in Ljubljana, Slovenia, where he led China's Jin Boyang after the short program and finished 3.84 points behind Jin overall after the latter landed three quadruple jumps in the free skate. He went on to win gold in Tallinn, Estonia, outscoring Japan's Sota Yamamoto by 5.67 points, and qualified for his second consecutive Junior Grand Prix Final, where he would eventually take home the bronze medal after finishing second in the free skate. Competing on the senior level at the 2014 Finlandia Trophy, he placed second in the short and third in the free skate, taking the bronze medal behind American Adam Rippon. Petrov won his first international senior title at the 2014 Cup of Nice after placing first in both programs and outscoring fellow medalists Artur Dmitriev, Jr. and Keiji Tanaka by over thirty points. He then followed that win with a gold medal at the 2014 Volvo Open Cup. On November 22, Petrov placed first at the 2014 Warsaw Cup posting personal best scores with a total of 231.53 points.

In early 2015, Petrov fell ill several times with an acute respiratory infection. Illness took its toll on his performance at the World Junior Championships where he finished 6th overall after winning a bronze medal for the short program. Petrov ended the season in the top 20 in the ISU World Standings with a Seasonal Best score in the top 20 as well. In the ISU Seasonal World Standings, he was ranked 12th at the end of the 2014-2015 season and finished second in the Challenger Series rankings.

2015–16 season: Full senior debut 
In 2015, Petrov moved up to the senior Grand Prix circuit and received two GP assignments. He made his senior Grand Prix debut at 2015 Skate Canada International. He finished 6th overall and was subsequently invited to the gala event where he did an exhibition number to the song All Star. At his second Grand Prix event, 2015 Trophée Éric Bompard, Petrov completed another clean skate and placed 6th going into the free skate. Due to the November 2015 Paris attacks, the free skating event was cancelled. Eventually, the ISU decided to award points from the competition based on the placing of the skaters after the short program.

At the 2016 Russian Championships in Ekaterinburg in December, Petrov once again skated a clean program and placed 5th after the short program. He completed a flawless free skate to move up two placings and win the bronze medal, his first senior Russian Championships medal at the young age of 16 years. Petrov’s TES in the free skate was the highest in the entire competition. His triple Axel combination received 2.00 GOE and his solo triple Axel received 1.71 GOE. It was revealed after the event that he had in fact been carrying a ligament injury to his leg going into the competition, after falling badly just one and a half weeks before the Championships.

After finishing on the podium at the 2016 Russian Championships, Petrov earned the right to represent Russia at the 2016 European Championships in Bratislava. Due to an illness contracted after returning from a training camp in Estonia a fortnight before the European Championships, he had not been able to train until three days before he flew to Bratislava. Even so, he fought hard and skated both programs cleanly, being the only Russian man to do so and eventually finishing eighth overall on his debut. He also set a new personal best in the short program and a season's best in the free skate.

2016–17 season 
In 2016, Petrov started his season at the 2016 Nebelhorn Trophy where he won gold after placing first in both the short and free skate with a total of 232.21 points. For the 2016-17 Grand Prix season, Petrov has been assigned the 2016 Skate Canada International and the 2016 Cup of China.

2017–18 season 
Petrov began the season at 2017 CS Lombardia Trophy, finishing seventh, and then competed at a second Challenger event, the 2017 CS Finlandia Trophy, where he came ninth.  He was assigned to the 2017 Cup of China and the 2017 Skate America, coming eleventh at the Cup of China before withdrawing from Skate America.  He then competed at a third Challenger, the 2017 CS Golden Spin of Zagreb, coming eighth.  He withdrew from the 2018 Russian Championships.

2018–19 season 
Petrov placed seventh at the 2019 Russian Championships.

2020-21 season 

In October, it was announced that he had changed coaches to work with Evgeni Plushenko.

Programs

Competitive highlights 
GP: Grand Prix; CS: Challenger Series; JGP: Junior Grand Prix

Detailed results
Small medals for short program and free skating awarded only at ISU Championships.

Senior level

 C= Cancelled.

Junior level

References

External links 

 
 

1999 births
Russian male single skaters
Living people
Figure skaters from Saint Petersburg